Radslavice is a municipality and village in Přerov District in the Olomouc Region of the Czech Republic. It has about 1,100 inhabitants.

History
The first written verified mention of Radslavice is from 1375. A forgery from 1269 also mentions Radslavice, but it is at least 50 years older.

Twin towns – sister cities

Radslavice is twinned with:
 Raslavice, Slovakia

References

Villages in Přerov District